Ciril Metod Koch (31 March 1867 – 6 May 1925) was a Slovene architect. Together with Max Fabiani, he introduced the Vienna Secession style in the Slovene Lands.

Koch was born in Kranj, then part of the Duchy of Carniola in the Austro-Hungarian Monarchy, now in Slovenia. He studied in Ljubljana, Graz, and in Vienna. In 1893, he got a job in the Ljubljana City Urban Planning Office. He rose to prominence  after the Ljubljana earthquake, when he reconstructed several buildings in the Vienna Secession style.

Between 1895 and 1910, he designed numerous buildings in Ljubljana, Celje, Radovljica, Opatija, Bohinj, and Šternberk.

He died in Ljubljana.

Gallery
Architecture in the centre of Ljubljana, designed by Ciril Metod Koch

Sources 

Encyclopedia of Slovene Biography
Robert Simonišek, The Architecture of Ciril Metod Koch 

1867 births
1925 deaths
People from Kranj
Vienna Secession architects
Slovenian architects
Art Nouveau architects